The Centre for the Study of Local Cultures (CSLC), better known as the CSLC, is a research centre at Kuvempu University located in the rural village Shankaraghatta in the Shimoga district of Karnataka (India). It was founded in 2004-2005.

The study of local cultures in India has so far been confined to the traditional approach of the departments of folk culture, English literature and socio-anthropological studies. There is a need to release the study of local cultures from these confines and to put it in a broader framework of interdisciplinary studies. Recognizing this, some of us, from within the Kuvempu University and the Research Centre Vergelijkende Cultuurwetenschap in Belgium came together to set up the Centre for the Study of Local Cultures (CSLC). Financial assistance for this project is provided by the Flemish Interuniversity Council – VLIR. The long-term goal of the Centre for the Study of Local Cultures is to become an internationally renowned research centre on South-Indian culture and society, which cultivates deep links with the local society and its cultural traditions.

Brief history

There are four phases in the elaboration of the idea to develop a Centre for the Study of Local Cultures (CSLC): (a) In the course of 4 years from 2004–2007, a joint research project on caste and community in the rural areas of Karnataka was set up at Kuvempu University. Its success generated the idea of developing a research centre at the University. The collaboration also revealed some major problems afflicting the social sciences: a virtually non-existent social scientific research culture; the detachment of the dominant ‘theories’ from local society; absence of research training; the limited access to relevant literature; and so on. (b) In 2005, A VLIR Zuidinitiatief, was initiated which trained some of the faculty from the School of Social Sciences at the Kuvempu University. This project resulted in the creation of a research group and a small library in the CSLC, which now has separate rooms at the University. Ghent and Kuvempu University also collaborated on writing a VLIR-IUC proposal, which included the plan of developing the CSLC. Even though it was not selected, the VLIR Bureau UOS valued the social sciences component of the proposal and suggested the transformation of this component into an Own Initiative. In November 2005, several meetings took place at Kuvempu to discuss the nature of this proposal and the future development of the CSLC. Here, the team launched the idea to create an Academy of Social Sciences and Humanities (ASHA, formerly KASSH), which would address the crisis of the social sciences at the state level. These discussions laid the foundations for the Letter of Intent. (c) In June 2006, an EC Asia-Link project regarding the stereotypical images and cultural differences between Europe and South-Asia began. The EC project aimed to establish a large-scale educational network between 5 universities, including Kuvempu University. 5 research scholars belonging to the CSLC team were trained to teach and do research. (d) In August 2006, the first activity of the Asia-Link project brought the entire Kuvempu University team to Ghent. This enabled discussions about the future of the CLSC, the idea of the ASHA, and the full-fledged VLIR Own Initiatives proposal. The then Vice-Chancellor and the Registrar of the Kuvempu University visited Ghent to discuss the content of the final proposal and to negotiate an MoU and a Cooperation Agreement. The Ghent team organised a PCM workshop with the Kuvempu team, where detailed stakeholder, problem and objective analyses took place. Thus, a modified logical framework and the final formulation of the proposal came into existence.

Research scholars and their research areas

1. Santhosh Kumar PK, Castes and Rituals

2. Praveen TL, Novels and Social Sciences

3. Mahesh Kumar CS, Sufi Tradition

4. Kavitha PN, Problems of Caste Classification

5. Shankarappa NS, Dalit Consciousness

6. Shivu Kumar, Kannada Literature and the Representation of Society

Scholars and faculty working in the institution
Chief Promoter: Prof. S.N. Balagangadhara, Ghent University, 

Local Promoter: Prof. J.S. Sadananda, Professor of Political Science, Kuvempu University

Director: Prof. Rajaram Hegde, Professor of History, Kuvempu University

Deputy Director: Dr. Shanmukha A, Lecturer in Political Science, Kuvempu University

Research Coordinator: Dr. Dunkin Jalki, University of Pardubice

Programme Officer: Mr. Sandeep Kumar Shetty, India Platform, Bangalore

Administrator: Mr. Indudhara

Sources

External links
 http://cslcku.wordpress.com/
 https://web.archive.org/web/20080311060010/http://www.cultuurwetenschap.be/PROJECTS.htm
 https://web.archive.org/web/20110721150216/http://www.kuvempu.ac.in/ac-dpt-cslc.htm
 A documentary about the Centre

Research institutes in Karnataka
Education in Shimoga district
Research institutes established in 2004
2004 establishments in Karnataka